Novoilyinsky (masculine), Novoilyinskaya (feminine), or Novoilyinskoye (neuter) may refer to:
Novoilyinsky City District, a city district of Novokuznetsk, Kemerovo Oblast, Russia
Novoilyinsky (inhabited locality) (Novoilyinskaya, Novoilyinskoye), name of several inhabited localities in Russia